April 9th is a 2015 Danish war film directed by Roni Ezra, and starring Pilou Asbæk and Lars Mikkelsen. The film depicts the German invasion of Denmark which commenced on 9 April 1940 and follows a Danish bicycle infantry company sent as a vanguard to slow down the German advance until reinforcements can arrive.

The film's budget was 22 million Danish krone (just over $3 million) and was supported by the Danish Film Institute, TV 2, and the Haderslev Municipality. The film was released in Danish cinemas on 12 March 2015.

Plot
During the night of 9 April 1940, the Danish army is alerted that the German army has crossed the border, and Denmark is now at war with Europe's strongest army. In South Jutland, a Danish bicycle infantry company and motorcycle platoon is ordered to hold off the German advance until reinforcements can arrive but are quickly overwhelmed by superior German forces. During the morning Second Lieutenant Sand (Pilou Asbæk) and his platoon of soldiers battle the Germans and then retreat to Haderslev.

Cast

 Lars Mikkelsen – Lieutenant-Colonel Hintz
 Pilou Asbæk – Second Lieutenant Sand
 Gustav Dyekjær Giese – Private Andersen
 Sebastian Bull Sarning – Private Lundgren
 Joachim Fjelstrup – Sergeant Bundgaard
 Martin Greis – Lieutenant Gjermansen
 Michael Brostrup – Colonel Hartz
 Elliott Crosset Hove – Private Jens-Otto Lassen
 Jannik Lorenzen – Private Gram
 Morten Hauch-Fausbøll – Major Fladsaa
 Mikkel Trøst Bentzen – Private Nørreskov
 Ari Alexander – Private Justesen
 Mathias Lundkvist – Private Kolding
 Jesper Hagelskær Paasch – Major Jepsen
 Jan Jürgensen – Sergent Klostergaard
 Simon Sears – Captain Holm
 Jan Dose – Lieutenant-Colonel Becker
 Jesper Hagelskær Paasch – Lieutenant Jepsen
 Pelle Emil Hebsgaard – Runner
 Jan Dose – Oberleutnant Becker

Production
The film was directed by Roni Ezra, and the screenplay was by Tobias Lindholm (who also wrote A Hijacking, Borgen, and The Hunt). The outline story was based on eyewitness accounts, conversations, and interviews with the few surviving veterans of 9 April 1940, who fought the invading German Army.

The Mellem Slesvigs Grænser museum in Bylderup-Bov was approached by Nordisk Film in the autumn of 2013 with regards to assisting with uniforms and weapons. In March 2014, the film company collected 120 Danish steel helmets, 100 gas-mask canisters, 50 pairs of wool pants, 24 dummy-rifles, 32 cartridge belts, and a khaki officer coat. Moreover, the museum loaned two old Nimbus motorcycles with side-cars. All equipment was initially transported to Budapest, Hungary, where part of the movie was shot.

The film was also shot in Haderslev, where the streets around Møllepladsen, Sønderbro, and Convent Cemetery were sealed off from 17 to 19 June 2014. Other shooting took place at Jacob Michelsen's Farm in Aabenraa and in Søgårdlejren.

Reception
The film received mixed, but generally favorable reviews from Danish critics, with Berlingske and Ekko giving it 5 out of 6 stars, while others gave it between 2-5 out of 6 stars.

References

External links
 
 

2015 films
2015 war drama films
Danish war drama films
2010s Danish-language films
Danish World War II films
World War II films based on actual events
Films set in 1940
Films shot in Denmark
Films with screenplays by Tobias Lindholm
2015 drama films